The Ultimate Collection is a compilation album by Richard Marx. It was released exclusively in Australia in April 2016 featuring Marx's biggest hits in Australia and one new track.
The album debuted at number 37 in Australia.

Track listing
All songs written and composed by Richard Marx; except for track 13 co-written by Bruce Gaitsch and track 16 co-written by Ashley Gorley and Ross Copperman. 

"Right Here Waiting"
"Hazard"
"Should've Known Better"
"Endless Summer Nights"
"Now and Forever"
"Take This Heart"
"Satisfied"
"Hold On to the Nights"
"Angelia"
"Until I Find You Again"
"Keep Coming Back"
"The Way She Loves Me"
"Don't Mean Nothing"
"Children of the Night"
"Heaven Only Knows"
"Last Thing I Wanted"

Charts

References 

2016 compilation albums
Richard Marx albums
Albums produced by Richard Marx